Tyler is a given name which is gender-neutral but predominantly male, as well as a surname.

It is an Old English name derived from the Old French tieuleor, tieulier (tiler, tile maker) and the Middle English tyler, tylere.  The name was originally an occupational name for a housebuilder, one who lays tiles or bricks. It also holds the meaning of "doorkeeper of an inn" or "owner of a tavern", derived from its use in freemasonry as the name of the office of the outer guard. Among the earliest recorded uses of the surname is Wat Tyler (1341–1381) of Kent, England.

People with the surname Tyler
Alison Tyler (born 1972), American author of erotic literature
Aisha Tyler (born 1970), American actress, comedian, director, and talk show host
Anne Tyler (born 1941), Pulitzer Prize-winning U.S. novelist
Billy Tyler, English footballer
Bonnie Tyler (born 1951), Welsh rock singer
Devin Tyler (born 1986), American football player
Fred Tyler (born 1954), US Olympic team swimmer and aquatics coach
Gary Tyler (born 1958), American prisoner 
George Tyler (disambiguation), several people
Harold I. Tyler (1901–1967), New York assemblyman
Harold R. Tyler, Jr. (1922–2005), federal judge in New York
Harrison Ruffin Tyler (born 1928), American chemical engineer, businessperson, and preservationist
Harry Tyler (disambiguation), several people
James Hoge Tyler (1846–1925), American politician
Jeremy Tyler (born 1991), American basketball player
John Tyler Sr. (1747–1813), governor of Virginia and father of President John Tyler Jr.
John Tyler Jr. (1790–1862), tenth president of the United States
Julia Gardiner Tyler (1820–1889), second wife of President John Tyler
Kenneth E. Tyler (born 1931), American master printer and arts educator
Kyle Tyler (born 1996), American baseball player
L C Tyler (fl. 2000s), British writer of comic crime fiction
Lefty Tyler (1889–1953), born George Albert Tyler, American professional baseball pitcher 1910–1921
Letitia Christian Tyler (1790–1842), first wife of President John Tyler
Liv Tyler (born 1977), American actress, model, and daughter of Steven Tyler
Lyon Gardiner Tyler (1853–1935), American educator and historian
Marilyn Tyler (1926–2017), American operatic soprano
Mark Tyler (born 1977), English professional footballer
Martin Tyler (born 1945), English sports commentator
Michael J. Tyler (1937–2020), South Australian herpetologist, known as "The Frog Man"
Paul Tyler, Baron Tyler (born 1941), English member of the House of Lords
Richard Tyler (architect) (1916–2009), English architect
Robert O. Tyler (1831–1874), American Civil War general in the Union Army
Stephanie Tyler, British Ornithologist
Steven Tyler (born 1948), American musician, songwriter and lead singer of Aerosmith
Syd Tyler (1904–1971), English footballer
Tank Tyler (Demarcus Lamon Tyler, born 1985), American football player
Ted Tyler (Edwin James Tyler, 1864–1917), English cricketer
T. Texas Tyler (1916–1972), American country music singer
Tom Tyler (1903–1954), American actor
Varro Eugene Tyler (1926–2001), American philatelist
Wat Tyler (Walter Tyler, died 1381), English leader of the English Peasants' Revolt of 1381

People with the middle name Tyler
Richard Tyler Blevins (born 1991), American Twitch streamer and Internet personality
Mary Tyler Moore (1936–2017), American actress
Jesse Tyler Ferguson (born 1975), American actor

People with the given name Tyler
tyler1 (born 1995), American Twitch streamer and online personality
Tyler, The Creator (born 1991), American rapper and record producer
Tyler Abell (born 1932), American lawyer
Tyler Acord (born 1990), American record producer and songwriter
Tyler Adams (born 1999), American soccer player
Tyler Aldridge (born 1984), American professional golfer
Tyler Alexander (born 1994), American baseball player
Tyler Allen (motorsport) (born 1987), American race engineer
Tyler Allgeier (born 2000), American football player
Tyler Alvarez (born 1997), American actor
Tyler Anbinder (born 1962), American historian
Tyler Anderson (born 1989), American baseball pitcher
Tyler Ankrum (born 2001), American stock car racing driver
Tyler Ardron (born 1991), Canadian rugby union player
Tyler Armstrong (born 2004), American mountain climber
Tyler Arnason (born 1979), American ice hockey player
Tyler Arnone (born 1991), American soccer player
Tyler Attardo (born 2001), Canadian soccer player
Tyler August (born 1983), American politician
Tyler Austin (born 1991), American professional baseball player
Tyler Badie (born 1999), American football player
Tyler Barnhardt (born 1993), American actor 
Tyler Bashlor (born 1993), American baseball player
Tyler Bass (born 1997), American football player
Tyler Bate (born 1997), English professional wrestler
Tyler Bates (born 1965), American musician
Tyler Baze (born 1982), American champion jockey
Tyler Beechey (born 1981), Canadian ice hockey player
Tyler Beede (born 1993), American baseball player
Tyler Bellamy (born 2001), American soccer player
Tyler Beskorowany (born 1990), Canadian ice hockey player
Tyler Bennett (born 1992), American Paralympic footballer
Tyler Benson (born 1998), Canadian ice hockey player
Tyler Bertuzzi (born 1995), Canadian ice hockey player
Tyler Bey (born 1998), American basketball player
Tyler Biadasz (born 1997), American football player
Tyler Biggs (born 1993), American ice hockey player
Tyler Birch (born 1995), New Zealand rugby league footballer
Tyler Blackburn (born 1986), American actor and singer
Tyler Blackett (born 1994), English professional footballer
Tyler Blackwood (born 1991), English footballer
Tyler Blanski (born 1984), American musician, author and record producer
Tyler Bleyendaal (born 1990), New Zealand rugby player
Tyler Booth (born 1996), American musician
Tyler Bouck (born 1980), Canadian ice hockey player
Tyler Boudreau (born 1971), American military veteran
Tyler Botha (born 1980), South African skeleton racer
Tyler Bowen (born 1989), American football player
Tyler Boyd (disambiguation), multiple people
Tyler Bozak (born 1986), Canadian ice hockey player
Tyler Bradt (born 1986), American whitewater kayaker
Tyler Bray (born 1991), American football player
Tyler Brayton (born 1979), American football player
Tyler Brenner (born 1988), Canadian ice hockey player
Tyler Brickler (born 1991), American ice hockey player
Tyler Brown (born 1990), Canadian ice hockey player
Tyler Brûlé (born 1968), Canadian journalist and magazine publisher
Tyler Breeze (born 1988), Canadian professional wrestler
Tyler Bryant (born 1991), American rock musician
Tyler Bunch (born 1970), American actor, director and puppet designer
Tyler Bunz (born 1992), Canadian ice hockey player
Tyler Burton (born 2000), American basketball player
Tyler Butterfield (born 1983), Bermudian cyclist and triathlete
Tyler Cain (born 1987), American basketball player
Tyler Cameron (born 1993), American television personality and model
Tyler Carter (born 1991), American singer, songwriter and musician
Tyler Carter (born 1994), American para-alpine skier
Tyler Cassel (born 1995), Scottish footballer
Tyler Cassidy (born 1993), American singer, songwriter and rapper better known by the name 'Froggy Fresh'
Tyler Catalina (born 1993), American football player
Tyler Cavanaugh (born 1994), American basketball player
Tyler Chatwood (born 1989), American baseball player
Tyler Childers (born 1991), American singer and songwriter
Tyler Christopher (born 1972), American actor
Tyler Clary (born 1989), American swimmer
Tyler Clippard (born 1985), American baseball player
Tyler Cloyd (born 1984), American baseball player
Tyler Clutts (born 1984), American football player
Tyler Collins (disambiguation), multiple people
Tyler Colvin (born 1985), American baseball player
Tyler Conklin (born 1995), American football player
Tyler Connolly (born 1975), Canadian vocalist and guitarist for rock band Theory of a Deadman
Tyler Cook (born 1997), American basketball player
Tyler Coppin (born 1956), American-Australian actor
Tyler Cowen (born 1962), American professor
Tyler Coyle (born 1998), American football player
Tyler Crapigna (born 1992), Canadian football player
Tyler Cravy (born 1989), American baseball player
Tyler Cuma (born 1990), Canadian-Austrian ice hockey player 
Tyler Curry (born 1983), American HIV activist
Tyler Danish (born 1994), American baseball player
Tyler Davis (disambiguation), multiple people
Tyler Deis (born 1974), Canadian ice hockey player
Tyler Denton (born 1995), English professional footballer
Tyler Deric (born 1988), American soccer player
Tyler Dickerson (born 1993), American country music artist
Tyler Dickinson (born 1996), English rugby league footballer
Tyler Diep (born 1983), Vietnamese born American politician
Tyler Dietrich (born 1984), Canadian ice hockey coach
Tyler Dippel (born 2000), American professional stock car racing driver
Tyler Donati (born 1986), Canadian ice hockey player
Tyler Dorsey (born 1996), American basketball player in the Israeli Basketball Premier League
Tyler Dueck (born 1986), Canadian racing driver
Tyler Duffey (born 1990), American baseball player
Tyler Duncan (born 1989), American golfer
Tyler Ebell (born 1983), Canadian football running back
Tyler Eckford (born 1985), Canadian ice hockey player
Tyler Edey (born 1984), Canadian billiards player
Tyler Eifert (born 1990), American football player, tight end for the Cincinnati Bengals
Tyler Engel (born 1992), American soccer player
Tyler Ennis (born 1989), Canadian ice hockey player
Tyler Ennis (born 1994), Canadian basketball player
Tyler Eppler (born 1993), American baseball player
Tyler Ervin (born 1993), American football player
Tyler Everett (born 1983), American football safety
Tyler Ewing (born 1984), American television composer
Tyler Farr (born 1984), American country music singer and songwriter
Tyler Farrar (born 1984), American cyclist
Tyler Feeley (born 1997), Serbian-American soccer player
Tyler Fisher (born 1993), South African rugby player
Tyler Florence (born 1971), American chef and television personality
Tyler Flowers (born 1986), American baseball player
Tyler Ford (born 1990), American writer
Tyler Fredrickson (born 1981), American football player
Tyler Freeman (born 2003), American soccer player
Tyler French (born 1999), English professional footballer
Tyler Frost (born 1999), English professional footballer
Tyler Gabarra (born 1997), American soccer player
Tyler Gaffney (born 1984), American baseball player
Tyler Gaudet (born 1984), Canadian ice hockey player
Tyler Garratt (born 1996), English footballer
Tyler Gauthier (born 1997), American football player
Tyler George (born 1982), American curler
Tyler Geving (born 1973), American basketball player
Tyler Gibson (born 1991), American soccer player
Tyler Gillett (born 1982), American film director
Tyler Goeddel (born 1996), American baseball player
Tyler Goodrham (born 2003), English professional footballer
Tyler Goodson (born 2000), American football player
Tyler Glasnow (born 1993), American baseball player
Tyler Glenn (born 1983), lead singer and keyboardist of Neon Trees
Tyler Graham (born 1984), American baseball player
Tyler Graovac (born 1993), Canadian ice hockey player
Tyler Green (disambiguation), multiple people
Tyler Griffey (born 1990), American basketball player
Tyler Grisham (born 1987), American football player
Tyler Gron (born 1989), Canadian ice hockey player
Tyler Hall (disambiguation), multiple people
Tyler Hamilton (born 1971), American cyclist
Tyler Hanes (born 1990), American actor, singer and dancer
Tyler Hansbrough (born 1985), American basketball player
Tyler Haws (born 1991), American baseball player
Tyler Heineman (born 1991), American baseball player
Tyler Hemming (born 1985), Canadian soccer player
Tyler Hentschel (born 1982), American guitarist
Tyler Herro (born 2000), American basketball player
Tyler Herron (1986–2021), American baseball player
Tyler Hicks (born 1969), American photojournalist 
Tyler Higbee (born 1993), American football player
Tyler Higgins (born 1991), American baseball player
Tyler Hill (born 1994), American stock car racing driver
Tyler Hilton (born 1983), American singer/songwriter/actor
Tyler Hines (born 1990), American basketball player
Tyler Hinman (born 1984), American crossword solver
Tyler Hoechlin (born 1987), American actor
Tyler Hogan (born 1998), Australian curler
Tyler Holmes (born 1988), Canadian football player
Tyler Holt (born 1989), American baseball player
Tyler Honeycutt (1990–2018), American basketball player
Tyler Hoover (American Football) (born 1990), American football player
Tyler Horn (born 1989), American football player
Tyler Hornby-Forbes (born 1996), British Virgins Islands footballer
Tyler Houston (born 1971), American baseball player
Tyler Hubbard (born 1987), American singer/songwriter
Tyler Hughes (born 1981), Canadian professional soccer player
Tyler Huntley (born 1998), American football player
Tyler Hynes (born 1986), Canadian actor
Tyler Ivey (born 1996), American baseball player
Tyler James (American musician) (born 1982), American musician, music producer, songwriter and singer
Tyler James (English musician) (born Kenneth Gordon in 1982), British singer and songwriter
Tyler James Williams (born 1992), African-American actor
Tyler Johnson (disambiguation), multiple people
Tyler Johnstone (born 1992), American football player
Tyler Joseph (born 1988), American musician in the band twenty one pilots
Tyler Kalinoski (born 1992), American basketball player
Tyler Kelly (born 1988), American baseball player
Tyler Kennedy (born 1986), Canadian professional hockey player
Tyler Kent (1911–1988), American diplomat and convicted spy
Tyler Kepkay (born 1987), Canadian basketball player
Tyler Kettering (born 1984), American soccer player
Tyler Kinley (born 1991), American baseball pitcher
Tyler Knight (born 1984), American indoor football linebacker
Tyler Kolek (born 1995), American baseball pitcher
Tyler Kornfield (born 1991), American Olympic cross-country skier
Tyler Krieger (born 1994), American baseball player
Tyler Kroft (born 1993), American football player
Tyler Kyte (born 1984), Canadian actor and musician
Tyler Labine (born 1978), Canadian actor
Tyler Ladendorf (born 1988), American baseball player
Tyler Lafauci (born 1952), American football player
Tyler Lamb (born 1991), American basketball player
Tyler Lancaster (born 1994), American football player
Tyler Larsen (born 1991), American football player
Tyler Larter (born 1968), Canadian ice hockey centre
Tyler Lawlor (born 1990), Canadian canoer
Tyler Layton (born 1968), American actress
Tyler Lepley (born 1987), American actor
Tyler Lassiter (born 1989), American soccer player
Tyler LaTorre (born 1983), American baseball coach
Tyler Lewington (born 1994), Canadian ice hockey player
Tyler LeVander (born 1990), American musician and producer 
Tyler Light (born 1991), American golfer
Tyler Linderbaum (born 2001), American football player
Tyler Lindholm (born 1983), American politician
Tyler Lockett (born 1992), American football player
Tyler C. Lockett (born 1932), Kansas judge
Tyler Lorenzen (born 1985), American football player
Tyler Lovell (born 1987), Australian hockey player
Tyler Ludwig (born 1985), American ice hockey player
Tyler Luellen (born 1984), American football player
Tyler Lumsden (born 1983), American baseball player
Tyler Lussi (born 1995), American soccer player
Tyler Lydon (born 1990), American basketball player
Tyler Lyons (born 1998), American baseball player
Tyler Lyttle (born 1996), English footballer
Tyler Mabry (born 1996), American football player
Tyler MacKay (born 1980), Canadian ice hockey player
Tyler MacNiven, American filmmaker and reality TV contestant
Tyler Madden (born 1999), American ice hockey player
Tyler Mahle (born 1994), American baseball player
Tyler Mane (born 1991), Canadian actor
Tyler Marz (born 1992), American football player
Tyler Matakevich (born 1992), American football player
Tyler Matas (born 1994), Filipino-born American football player
Tyler Matthews (born 1996), American stock car racing driver
Tyler Matzek (born 1990), American baseball player
Tyler McCaughn (born 1982), American politician
Tyler McCreary (born 1993), American boxer
Tyler McCumber (born 1991), American professional golfer
Tyler McGill (born 1987), American swimmer
Tyler McGregor (born 1994), Canadian ice hockey player
Tyler McNeely (born 1987), Canadian ice hockey player
Tyler Medeiros (born 1995), Canadian singer
Tyler Menezes (born 1992), Canadian-American businessperson
Tyler Merren (born 1984), American goalball player
Tyler Metcalfe (born 1984), Canadian born Hungarian ice hockey player
Tyler Miller (disambiguation), multiple people
Tyler Mislawchuk (born 1994), Canadian professional triathlete
Tyler Mitchell (born 1995), American photographer
Tyler Mizoguchi (born 1989), American gymnast
Tyler Moore (disambiguation), multiple people
Tyler Morley (born 1991), Canadian ice hockey player
Tyler Mosienko (born 1984), Canadian ice hockey player
Tyler Moss (born 1975), Canadian ice hockey player
Tyler Motte (born 1995), American ice hockey player
Tyler Moy (born 1995), Swiss-American ice hockey player
Tyler Mulder (born 1987), American track and field athlete
Tyler Murphy (born 1992), American football player
Tyler Myers (born 1990), American born Canadian ice hockey player
Tyler Nase (born 1990), American rower
Tyler Naquin (born 1991), American baseball player
Tyler Neitzel (born 1991), American actor
Tyler Nella (born 1988), Canadian alphine skier
Tyler Nelson (born 1995), American basketball player
Tyler Nevin (born 1997), American baseball player
Tyler Newton (born 1982), American basketball player
Tyler Nicholson (born 1995), Canadian snowboarder 
Tyler Nordgren (born 1969), American professor
Tyler O'Neill (born 1995), Canadian baseball player
Tyler Oakley (born 1989), American vlogger and advocate for gay youth 
Tyler Olson (disambiguation), multiple people
Tyler Ott (born 1992), American football player
Tyler Palko (born 1983), American football player
Tyler Palmer (born 1950), American alpine skier
Tyler Pasher (born 1994), Canadian soccer player
Tyler Pastornicky (born 1989), American baseball player
Tyler Patmon (born 1991), American football player
Tyler Patrick Jones (born 1994), American actor
Tyler Paul (born 1995), South African rugby player
Tyler Perry (born 1969), American actor, filmmaker, television producer, songwriter, author
Tyler Phillips (born 1997), American professional baseball pitcher
Tyler Pill (born 1990), American baseball player
Tyler Pitlick (born 1991), American ice hockey player
Tyler Pizarro (born 1986), Canadian jockey
Tyler Polak (born 1992), American soccer player
Tyler Polumbus (born 1985), American football player
Tyler Pope (born 1977), American guitarist
Tyler Posey (born 1991), American actor and musician
Tyler Pursel (born 1983), American songwriter and record producer
Tyler Randell (rugby league) (born 1992), Australian rugby player
Tyler Randell (ice hockey), Canadian ice hockey player
Tyler Rasch (born 1988), American television personality
Tyler Reddick (born 1996), American stock car racing driver
Tyler Redenbach (born 1984), Canadian ice hockey player
Tyler Reed (disambiguation), multiple people
Tyler Rees (born 1999), Welsh snooker player
Tyler Reese (born 1993), American musician
Tyler Reid (born 1997), English professional footballer
Tyler Relph (born 1984), American basketball player
Tyler Rich (born 1986), American country music singer
Tyler Richards (born 1986), Canadian lacrosse player
Tyler Riggs (born 1986), American model and actor
Tyler Ritter (born 1985), American actor
Tyler Rix (born 1993), British singer and songwriter
Tyler Roberson (born 1994), American basketball player
Tyler Roberts (born 1999), English professional footballer
Tyler Robertson (born 1987), American baseball player
Tyler Robinson, multiple people
Tyler Roehl (born 1986), American football coach
Tyler Rogers (born 1990), American baseball player
Tyler Rosenlund (born 1986), Canadian soccer player
Tyler Ross (born 1989), American actor
Tyler Rudy (born 1993), American soccer player
Tyler Russell (born 1990), American football player
Tyler Ruthven (born 1988), American soccer player
Tyler Saladino (born 1989), American baseball player
Tyler Sambrailo (born 1992), American football player
Tyler Sanders (born 1991), Canadian volleyball player
Tyler Schmitt (born 1986), American football player
Tyler Schultz (born 1994), American shot putter
Tyler Scott (born 1985), Canadian football player
Tyler Seguin (born 1992), Canadian professional hockey player
Tyler Seitz (born 1976), Canadian lunger
Tyler Shandro (born 1976), Canadian lawyer and politician
Tyler Shatley (born 1991), American football player
Tyler Shattock (born 1990), Canadian professional ice hockey player
Tyler Shaw (born 1993), Canadian singer and actor
Tyler Sheehan (born 1987), American football player
Tyler Shelast (born 1984), Canadian professional ice hockey player
Tyler Shelvin (born 1998), American football player
Tyler Shields (born 1982), American photographer
Tyler Shoemaker (born 1988), American football player
Tyler Shough (born 1999), American football player
Tyler Smith (disambiguation), multiple people
Tyler Skaggs (1991–2019), American baseball player
Tyler Stableford (born 1975), American commercial director
Tyler Starr (born 1991), American football player
Tyler Steen (born 2000), American football player
Tyler Stephenson (born 1996), American baseball player
Tyler Stewart (born 1967), Canadian musician
Tyler Stinson (born 1986), American mixed martial artist
Tyler Stone (born 1991), American basketball player
Tyler Strafaci (born 1998), American golfer
Tyler Sturdevant (born 1985), American baseball player
Tyler Summitt (born 1990), American basketball coach
Tyler Tardi (born 1998), Canadian curler
Tyler Tanner (born 1991), American professional stock race car driver
Tyler Thigpen (born 1984), American football player
Tyler Thomas (born 1990), American football player
Tyler Thornburg (born 1988), American baseball player
Tyler Toffoli (born 1992), Canadian ice hockey player
Tyler Toland (born 2001), American football player
Tyler Ulis (born 1996), American basketball player
Tyler Varga (born 1993), American football player
Tyler Vaughns (born 1997), American football player
Tyler Vlahovich (born 1967), American artist
Tyler Volk, professor at New York University
Tyler Vorpagel, American politician
Tyler Wade (born 1994), American baseball player
Tyler Wagner (born 1991), American baseball player
Tyler Walker (disambiguation), multiple people
Tyler Ward (born 1988), American singer, songwriter and producer
Tyler Webb (born 1990), American baseball player
Tyler Weiman (born 1984), Canadian ice hockey player
Tyler Weir (born 1990), English professional footballer
Tyler Wells (born 1994), American baseball player
Tyler White (born 1990), American baseball player
Tyler Wideman (born 1995), American basketball player
Tyler Wilkerson (born 1988), American basketball player
Tyler Williams (disambiguation), multiple people
Tyler Williamson (born 1972), American golfer
Tyler Willis (born 1980), American beauty queen
Tyler Wilson (disambiguation), multiple people
Tyler Winklevoss (born 1981), American investor
Tyler Woods (born 1982), American singer-songwriter
Tyler Wolff (born 2003), American soccer player
Tyler Wotherspoon (born 1993), Canadian ice hockey player
Tyler Yarema (born 1993), Canadian singer and songwriter
Tyler Yates (born 1977), American baseball player
Tyler Young (disambiguation), multiple people
Tyler Zeller (born 1990), American basketball player
Tyler Zink (born 2001), American tennis player
Tyler Zuber (born 1995), American baseball player

Fictional characters
Surname
Darcy Tyler, from the Australian soap opera Neighbours
 Jamie Tyler, an American boy with mind control powers from Anthony Horowitz's Power of Five series
 Three fictional superheroes appearing in DC Comics:
 Rex Tyler, the Golden Age Hourman
Rick Tyler, his son and the second Hourman
Matthew Tyler, the third Hourman, an android appearing in DC One Million
Isabelle Tyler, from the American science fiction drama series The 4400
Rose Tyler, from the British science fiction television series Doctor Who
Jackie Tyler, from the British science fiction television series Doctor Who, Rose's mother
Pete Tyler, from the British science fiction television series Doctor Who, Rose's father
Sam Tyler, from the British science fiction television series Life on Mars and its American adaptation
 Ron Tyler, a main character in Child's Play 3

Given name
 Tyler, a contestant from the Total Drama series
Tyler Barrol, a character from the American soap opera Revenge
Tyler Bowman, from the Canadian animated TV series Supernoobs
Tyler Brennan, from the Australian soap opera Neighbours
Tyler Brennen, from the TV series Burn Notice
Tyler Churchill, from the Australian soap opera Home and Away
Tyler Blu Gunderson, a blue Spix's macaw from Rio and its 2014 sequel, Rio 2 
Tyler Crowley, from Stephenie Meyer's best-selling book Twilight
 Tyler Cutebiker, from the animated TV series Gravity Falls
Tyler Dayspring, a character from comic books produced by Marvel. 
 Tyler Down, a character in the novel and Netflix series 13 Reasons Why
Tyler Downing, a character from the television series The 4400
Tyler Durden, from the novel Fight Club and the film adaptation
 Tyler James, from the TV series Dog with a Blog
Tyler King, from the Highlander TV and film series
 Tyler Leander, from the 2014 novel Station Eleven by Emily St. John Mandel
Tyler Lockwood, from the TV series Vampire Diaries
Tyler McCandless, from the American soap opera Capitol
Tyler Michaelson, from the American soap opera The Young and the Restless
Tyler Moon, from the British soap opera EastEnders
 Tyler Plummer, from the 2005 film The Pacifier
Tyler Sparks, from That's So Suite Life of Hannah Montana
Tyler Steele, from the TV series VR Troopers
Tyler Stone (Marvel Comics), from the comics imprint Marvel 2099

See also
Taylor (disambiguation)
Tylor (disambiguation)
Justice Tyler (disambiguation)

References

English feminine given names
English masculine given names
English unisex given names
English-language surnames
Occupational surnames
English-language occupational surnames
Surnames of English origin
Lists of people by given name